The People of Norrland (Swedish: Norrlänningar) is a 1930 Swedish silent drama film directed by Theodor Berthels and starring Carl Barcklind, Elisabeth Frisk and Georg Blomstedt. It was shot at the Råsunda Studios in Stockholm. The film's sets were designed by the art director Vilhelm Bryde.

Cast
 Carl Barcklind as Patron Berg
 Elisabeth Frisk as 	Annie Berg
 Georg Blomstedt as 	Carl Johan Edlund
 Hilda Borgström as 	Mrs. Edlund
 Harry Ahlin as 	Gunnar
 Stina Berg as 	Mamsell Mauritz
 Georg Skarstedt as 	Bertil Fågelberg
 Weyler Hildebrand as 	Langar-Simon
 Albin Jaenzon as 	Simon
 Joel Jansson as 	Erik
 Theodor Berthels as 	Läkaren 
 Sickan Castegren as Telefonisten 
 Edla Rothgardt as 	Kokerskan hos Berg

References

Bibliography 
 Nelmes, Jill & Selbo, Jule. Women Screenwriters: An International Guide. Palgrave Macmillan, 2015.

External links 
 

1930 films
Swedish drama films
1930 drama films
1930s Swedish-language films
Swedish silent feature films
Films directed by Theodor Berthels
Swedish black-and-white films
Silent drama films
1930s Swedish films